Katlang is a tehsil in the Mardan District of Khyber Pakhtunkhwa, Pakistan. It is located approximately 19 kilometers north of Mardan. The population of Katlang was 343,144 in 2017.

Katlang topaz

It is estimated that there are anywhere from 70,000 to 9,000,000 carats of pink topaz in and near Katlang. It is estimated that the Mingora emerald and the Katlang topaz can have a worth of up to Rs 20,000 per carat.

See also
 Mian Khan
 Sangao (Mardan District)
 Babuzai
 Kohi Barmol
 Patorako baba

References

 Populated places in Mardan District